Zygaena graslini is a moth of the family Zygaenidae. It is found in Syria, Mesopotamia, Asia Minor, Israel and Lebanon.
in graslini the 6 spots of forewing are confluent in pairs, there being a basal, central and marginal red area separated by black bands.  In the form
confluens Oberth. [synonym of graslini ], from Syria , the basal and central areas are also confluent, the wing being red from the base to beyond the middle.

Subspecies
Zygaena graslini graslini
Zygaena graslini czipkai G. & H. Reiss, 1971
Zygaena graslini kulzeri Reiss, 1932
Zygaena graslini maraschensis Reiss, 1935
Zygaena graslini pfeifferi Reiss, 1932
Zygaena graslini rebeliana Reiss & Tremewan, 1964
Zygaena graslini rebeli Reiss, 1932

References

Zygaena
Moths of Asia
Moths described in 1855